The 2004 Southern Illinois Salukis football team represented Southern Illinois University as a member of the Gateway Football Conference during the 2004 NCAA Division I-AA football season. They were led by fourth-year head coach Jerry Kill and played their home games at McAndrew Stadium in Carbondale, Illinois. The Salukis finished the season with a 10–2 record overall and a 7–0 record in conference play, making them conference champions. Southern Illinois was ranked No. 9 in The Sports Network's postseason ranking of FCS teams.

Running back Brandon Jacobs, a transfer from Auburn, rushed for 992 yards and 19 touchdowns during the season. He was drafted by the New York Giants in the 2005 NFL Draft.

Schedule

References

Southern Illinois
Southern Illinois Salukis football seasons
Missouri Valley Football Conference champion seasons
Southern Illinois Salukis football